Fritz Ernst Fischer (5 October 1912 – 2003) was a German medical doctor who, under the Nazi regime, participated in medical experiments conducted on inmates of the Ravensbrück concentration camp.

Fischer was born in Berlin. He studied medicine first at Bonn, later at Berlin and Leipzig, and finally graduated in Hamburg in 1938. He joined the SS in 1934 (ultimately reaching the rank of Sturmbannführer [major]) and became a member of the NSDAP in June 1937. On 1 November 1939, he was assigned to the Waffen-SS of the SS-Department of the Hohenlychen Sanatorium as a physician and SS Second Lieutenant.

In 1940, he became troop physician of the SS Division Leibstandarte Adolf Hitler. After having been wounded he was posted back to Hohenlychen and worked in the camp hospital of the Ravensbrück concentration camp as a surgical assistant to Karl Gebhardt. He participated in the surgical experiments carried out on concentration camp inmates there.

After World War II, he was tried in the Doctors' Trial in Nuremberg, convicted of war crimes and crimes against humanity, and was condemned to life imprisonment. His sentence was reduced to 15 years in 1951 and he was released in March 1954. Fischer subsequently regained his license to practice medicine and started a new career at the chemical company Boehringer in Ingelheim, where he stayed until his retirement.

Based on available records, when he died in 2003, aged 90 or 91, he was the last known living of those indicted at the Doctors' Trial.

References 

Schäfer, S.: Zum Selbstverständnis von Frauen im Konzentrationslager: das Lager Ravensbrück, p. 130f. PhD thesis 2002, TU Berlin. (PDF file, 741 kB). In German.
Schmidt, U.: Lebensläufe: Biographien und Motive der Angeklagte aus der Perspektive des medizinischen Sachverständigen, Dr. Leo Alexander, 1945-1947, in Dörner, K., Ebbinghaus, A. (ed.): Vernichten und Heilen: Der Nürnberger Ärzteprozess und seine Folgen; Aufbau-Verlag, Berlin 2001; ; pp. 374–404.
Waltrich, H.: Zur Geschichte der Heilanstalten vom Roten Kreuz in Hohenlychen, part 2, Ökostadt-Nachrichten 28 (1999).

Further reading 
Klier, F.: Die Kaninchen von Ravensbrück. Medizinische Versuche an Frauen in der NS-Zeit.; Droemer Verlag, Munich 1994, .

External links
Affidavit of Fritz Ernst Fischer

1912 births
2003 deaths
Physicians in the Nazi Party
People convicted by the United States Nuremberg Military Tribunals
Ravensbrück concentration camp personnel
German prisoners sentenced to life imprisonment
Prisoners sentenced to life imprisonment by the United States military
University of Hamburg alumni
Nazi human subject research
SS-Sturmbannführer
Physicians from Berlin
People from the Province of Brandenburg
German people convicted of crimes against humanity
Waffen-SS personnel
Boehringer Ingelheim people